Robat-e Sofla (also Romanized as Robāţ-e Soflá) is a village in Mongasht Rural District, in the Central District of Bagh-e Malek County, Khuzestan Province, Iran. At the 2006 census, its population was 88, in 16 families.

References 

Populated places in Bagh-e Malek County